Exclusive Audio Footage is the debut studio album from Virginia hip hop duo Clipse. The album spawned one single and music video "The Funeral", which hit airwaves in 1999. Promotional CD and vinyl copies exist and the LP has been leaked online on several occasions. In 2004, counterfeit vinyl pressings of the album were released. The album artwork is taken from the 2002 Lord Willin' photo shoot because of the promo CDs and vinyl of the album not containing any visible artwork, over time and through other bootleg copies the image was used as the album's default cover.

In 2022, the album, fully produced by The Neptunes, was released on streaming platforms, comprising 20 songs.

Background
Exclusive Audio Footage was meant to be the debut album of Clipse, after the group signed with Elektra Records. The album's only single was "The Funeral". It failed to catch success, and its label, Elektra, decided to indefinitely shelve the album. Clipse was released from its record contract not long afterward. At the time of the album's release, Clipse member Pusha T was known as "Terrar" and No Malice was known as "Malice".

Exclusive Audio Footage also marked the beginning of the Clipse's recording partnership with The Neptunes. Most of the album's content is very similar to the Clipse's following albums Lord Willin' and Hell Hath No Fury, focusing on the duo' drug-dealing pasts, though it was much more "theatrical" and "movie-esque" than either of its following albums.

Track listing 
All tracks produced by The Neptunes.

Notes
 On some editions of the album, there is a twenty-first/twenty-second track titled "Got Caught Dealin' - Part 2" featuring Pharrell, this track along with "The Funeral" and the original "Got Caught Dealin'" were all released as promo CD singles throughout 1999.

References 

Clipse albums
Elektra Records albums
1999 debut albums
2022 albums
Albums produced by the Neptunes